Ramdas Ransing is an Indian psychiatrist and researcher Mahatma Gandhi Institute of Medical Sciences, MGIMS best known for his work in Neuropsychiatry. He is a co-founder of the Pasay Foundation, an NGO dedicated to research in the fields of deaddiction and psychiatric work.

Awards and honours 
Ransing has received several awards and prizes: 
 The Early Career Travel Award of The International Marcé Society for Perinatal Mental Health at the Marcé Biennial Scientific Conference, Bangalore, India, 2018. 
 The Royal Australian and New Zealand College of Psychiatrists Fellowship for Early Intervention in Psychiatry at the World Psychiatric Association Thematic Congress, Melbourne, Australia, 2018.
 The Dr. Anil Kumar Dutt Award- awarded by the Indian Association of Private Psychiatry at its annual national conference, Kolkata, India, 2016.  
 The Sushrut Award- award by the Academy of Medical Sciences, 2015.

References

Living people
Indian psychiatrists
Indian medical researchers
Year of birth missing (living people)